Mark Williams is a Welsh international lawn and indoor bowler.

Williams won a fours gold medal at the 2000 World Outdoor Bowls Championship in Johannesburg with Stephen Rees, Will Thomas and Robert Weale.

References

Welsh male bowls players
Living people
Bowls World Champions
Year of birth missing (living people)